The Badami oil field is an oil field in the Alaska North Slope. Badami was discovered by Conoco in 1990 at the Badami Number 1 well. The oil field is described as a complex and discontinuous reservoir containing heavy weight oil gravity ranging from 21 to 30 degrees API. Initial cost of development was approximately $300 million.

BPXA began production in 1998, but production was suspended in August 2003. BP cited the field's poor performance producing only  saying it was not sufficient to offset costs. Production resumed in September 2005 on 6 month production and 6 month recharge cycles using technique's BP developed specifically for Badami.

Landing strip
Badami has a  x  landing strip located at the oil field near the Badami Central Processing Unit. There is also a dock along the shoreline nearby.

Savant takeover
In 2010 due to poor oil production and reservoir complications BP sold the field to Savant Alaska LLC, a Denver-based private company.  Miller Energy Resources, Inc. acquired Savant Alaska in February 2015.

See also
Prudhoe Bay oil field
Trans-Alaska Pipeline System

References

External links
Unit Map
Map

Geography of North Slope Borough, Alaska
Oil fields in Alaska
BP oil and gas fields